The Lion in Winter is a 1968 historical drama film set at Christmas 1183; it centres on political and personal turmoil among the royal family of Henry II of England, his wife Eleanor of Aquitaine, their three surviving sons, and the French king. The film was directed by Anthony Harvey; written by James Goldman (based on his own play of the same name); produced by Joseph E. Levine, Jane C. Nusbaum, and Martin Poll; and starred Peter O'Toole, Katharine Hepburn, John Castle, Anthony Hopkins (in his first major film role), Jane Merrow, Timothy Dalton (in his film debut) and Nigel Terry.

The film was a commercial success and won three Academy Awards, including Hepburn's historic tie with Barbra Streisand for Best Actress, making Hepburn the first three-time winner in the category. A television remake of the film was made in 2003.

Plot
The Lion in Winter is set during Christmas 1183, at King Henry II's château and primary residence in Chinon, Touraine, in the medieval Angevin Empire. Henry wants his youngest son, the future King John, to inherit his throne, while his estranged and imprisoned wife, Eleanor of Aquitaine, temporarily released from prison in England for the holidays, favours their eldest surviving son, the future King Richard I. King Philip II of France, the son and successor of Louis VII of France, Eleanor's ex-husband, is a guest. His father had made a treaty with King Henry giving Philip's half-sister Alais, who is currently Henry's mistress, to be married to Henry's future heir, and demands either a wedding or the return of her dowry, which is a strategically important area of land.

As a ruse, Henry agrees to give Alais to Richard and make him heir-apparent. He makes a deal with Eleanor for her freedom in return for Aquitaine, to be given to John, with Richard marrying Alais. When the deal is revealed at the wedding, Richard refuses to go through with the ceremony. After Richard leaves, Eleanor masochistically asks Henry to kiss Alais in front of her, and then looks on in horror as they perform a mock marriage ceremony. Having believed Henry's intentions, John, at the direction of middle brother, Geoffrey II, Duke of Brittany, plots with Philip to make war on Henry. Henry and Philip meet to discuss terms, but Henry soon learns that Philip has been plotting with John and Geoffrey, and that he and Richard were once lovers.

Henry dismisses all three sons as unsuitable and locks them in a wine cellar, telling Alais, "the royal boys are aging with the royal port." He makes plans to travel to Rome for an annulment of his marriage to Eleanor, so that he can have legitimate new sons with Alais, but she says he will never be able to release his sons from prison because they will be a threat to his future children. Henry sees that she is right and condemns them to death, but cannot bring himself to kill them, instead letting them escape. He and Eleanor go back to hoping for the future, with Eleanor returning on the barge to prison, laughing it off with Henry before she leaves.

Cast
 Peter O'Toole as Henry II, King of England, Lord of Ireland, Duke of Normandy and of Aquitaine, Count of Anjou (this is the second time O'Toole portrayed Henry II, after 1964's Becket with Richard Burton.)
 Katharine Hepburn as Eleanor of Aquitaine, his estranged queen
 Anthony Hopkins as Richard the Lionheart, their eldest surviving son
 John Castle as Geoffrey, their middle son
 Nigel Terry as John, their youngest son
 Timothy Dalton as Philip II, King of France 
 Jane Merrow as Alais, Philip's half-sister and Henry's mistress, betrothed to Henry's heir by treaty
 Nigel Stock as Captain William Marshall
 Kenneth Ives as Queen Eleanor's personal guard
 O. Z. Whitehead as Hugh de Puiset, the Bishop of Durham

Production

Writing
The original stage production had not been a success, getting a bad review in The New York Times and losing $150,000. Producer Martin Poll optioned Goldman's novel Waldorf for the movies. They discussed Lion in Winter, which Poll had read and loved. He hired Goldman to write a screenplay.

Casting
Poll was meant to make a film with Joseph Levine and Peter O'Toole, The Ski Bum (which would be written by James Goldman's brother William). That project fell through and Poll suggested they do Lion in Winter instead. O'Toole, who was 36, portrays Henry II at age 50. 

In October 1967, the actors rehearsed at Haymarket Theatre in London. Production started in November 1967 and continued until May 1968.

Filming
The film was shot at Ardmore Studios in Bray, County Wicklow, Ireland, and on location in Ireland, Wales (Marloes Sands), and in France at Abbaye de Montmajour, Arles; Château de Tarascon, Carcassonne; and Saône-et-Loire.

The sculpted stone figures appearing during the main title music were an unexpected find by the director while shooting scenes in France. They were filmed along the artist's driveway and the pictures later edited to create the title sequence where they appear to be on interior walls of the castle.

Reception
The film premiered on 30 October 1968 (29 December 1968 London premiere).

The film earned an estimated $6.4 million in distributor rentals in the domestic North American market during its initial year of release. It was the 14th most popular movie at the U.S. box office in 1969.

Renata Adler of The New York Times wrote that the film was "for the most part, outdoorsy and fun, full of the kind of plotting and action people used to go to just plain movies for."

Variety called it "an intense, fierce, personal drama put across by outstanding performance of Peter O'Toole and Katharine Hepburn. Anthony Harvey, a relatively new director, has done excellent work with a generally strong cast, literate adaptation by the author, and superb production values assembled by Martin H. Poll, who produced for Joseph E. Levine presentation under the Embassy banner."

Roger Ebert gave the film 4 stars out of 4, writing, "One of the joys which movies provide too rarely is the opportunity to see a literate script handled intelligently. 'The Lion in Winter' triumphs at that difficult task; not since 'A Man for All Seasons' have we had such capable handling of a story about ideas. But 'The Lion in Winter' also functions at an emotional level, and is the better film, I think."

Charles Champlin of the Los Angeles Times declared, "Top honors for the most literate movie of the year, and for the finest and most imaginative and fascinating evocation of an historical time and place, can be awarded this very day to 'The Lion in Winter.'"

Pauline Kael of The New Yorker was less positive, writing that the film miscalculated in attempting to elevate the melodramatic plot "with serious emotions, more or less authentic costumes and settings, pseudo-Stravinsky music, and historical pomp. And it just won't do to have actors carrying on as if this were a genuine, 'deep' historical play on the order of 'A Man for All Seasons' ... They're playing a camp historical play as if it were the real thing—delivering commercial near-poetry as if it were Shakespeare."

In a mixed review for The Monthly Film Bulletin, David Wilson called Katharine Hepburn's performance "perhaps the crowning achievement of an extraordinary career" but described the film as a whole as being "essentially a piece of highly polished theatricality, and not much else if one looks beyond its insistently sophisticated surface gloss."

The critical consensus reads, "Sharper and wittier than your average period piece, The Lion in Winter is a tale of palace intrigue bolstered by fantastic performances from Peter O'Toole, Katharine Hepburn, and Anthony Hopkins in his big-screen debut."

After the seeing the film, Albert R. Broccoli and Harry Saltzman offered Dalton the role of James Bond for the first time, as a replacement for Sean Connery in On Her Majesty's Secret Service (1969). Dalton declined because he felt he was too young, although he would later be cast in the role in The Living Daylights (1987) and Licence to Kill (1989).

Accolades

Preservation
The Academy Film Archive preserved The Lion in Winter in 2000.

Historical accuracy 

Though the background and the eventual destinies of the characters are generally accurate, The Lion in Winter is fictional: while there was a Christmas court at Caen in 1182, there was none at Chinon in 1183. In reality, Henry had many mistresses and many illegitimate children; the "Rosamund" mentioned in the film was his mistress until she died. The Revolt of 1173–1174 provides the historical background leading to the play's events. There was also a second rebellion, when Young Henry and Geoffrey revolted in 1183, resulting in Young Henry's death. While some historians have theorized that Richard was homosexual, it is not certain.

Geoffrey died in 1186 in a jousting tournament held in Paris (with some speculation that Geoffrey was involved in plotting against Henry with Philip at the time). A third rebellion against Henry by Richard and Philip in 1189 was finally successful, and a decisively defeated Henry retreated to Chinon in Anjou, where he died. Richard the Lionheart succeeded Henry II, but spent very little time in England (perhaps 6 months), after which he became a central Christian commander during the Third Crusade, leading the campaign after the departure of Philip. Richard won some considerable victories, but he did not succeed in retaking Jerusalem. John finally succeeded Richard in 1199 after Richard's death. During his unsuccessful reign he lost most of his father's holdings in Northern France and angered the English barons, who revolted and forced him to sign the Magna Carta. John is also known for being the villain in the Robin Hood legends. Lastly, William Marshal, who during the film is harried about by Henry II, outlived the English main characters and eventually ruled England as regent for the young Henry III.

See also
List of historical drama films
 List of Christmas films

Notes

Citations

Bibliography

External links

 
 
 
 
 

 

1968 films
1960s Christmas films
1960s historical drama films
Biographical films about English royalty
British Christmas drama films
British historical drama films
British LGBT-related films
British epic films
Henry II of England
Cultural depictions of Richard I of England
Cultural depictions of Eleanor of Aquitaine
Cultural depictions of John, King of England
Films about dysfunctional families
Films featuring a Best Actress Academy Award-winning performance
Films featuring a Best Drama Actor Golden Globe winning performance
Films whose writer won the Best Adapted Screenplay Academy Award
Films that won the Best Original Score Academy Award
British films based on plays
Films shot in Wales
Best Drama Picture Golden Globe winners
Films directed by Anthony Harvey
Films scored by John Barry (composer)
Films set in country houses
Films set in France
Films set in the 12th century
Films shot in the Republic of Ireland
Films with screenplays by James Goldman
Embassy Pictures films
1960s Christmas drama films
1968 LGBT-related films
1968 drama films
Films set in castles
1960s English-language films
1960s British films